Trey Lee (Chinese:李垂誼; pinyin: Chui-yee Lee) is a Hong Kong-born cellist based in Berlin, Germany. A laureate of major international competitions, he appears as a featured soloist with orchestras and festivals all over the world. He is also a member of Canada’s award-winning piano quartet Ensemble Made in Canada. Lee is the founding artistic director of Musicus Society and has spearheaded several music festivals such as the Musicus Fest and the Hong Kong International Chamber Music Festival.

Early life 
Lee was born in Hong Kong into a musical family. His mother attended the Central Conservatory of Music in Beijing for piano and his two sisters attended the Juilliard School in New York City to study piano and violin. Lee spent much of his youth studying in the United States.

Education 
Lee first graduated from the Juilliard School Pre-College Division and then went on to graduate from Harvard with an AB in Economics. He continued his musical studies at New England Conservatory for his master's degree, later furthering his education in Europe at the Reina Sofía School of Music in Madrid and the Cologne Musikhochschule in Germany. His teachers include Frans Helmerson, Laurence Lesser, and Ardyth Alton.

Career 
After graduating from Harvard University with an AB in Economics, Lee spent one year working as a management consultant at Parthenon (now EY) before continuing his musical education in Europe and pursuing a musical career.

Lee  has worked with well-known conductors, composers and orchestras worldwide, such as Lorin Maazel, Vladimir Ashkenazy, Santtu-Matias Rouvali, Dima Slobodeniouk, Leonard Slatkin, Vassily Sinaisky, Hannu Lintu, Osmo Vänskä, Jun Märkl, Bright Sheng, the Philharmonia Orchestra of London, Munich Chamber Orchestra, Orchestre Philharmonique de Radio France, Netherlands Philharmonic, BBC Philharmonic, Stuttgarter Kammerorchester, Moscow Chamber Orchestra, and Trondheim Soloists.

He is often invited as a featured artist at major events around the world including: a concert initiated by United Nations Secretary General Ban Ki-moon at the United Nations General Assembly Hall, alongside Maestro Lu Jia, composer Tan Dun, and coloratura soprano Sumi Jo; Phoenix Television's global live broadcast concert with the China Symphony Orchestra at the Beijing National Center for Performing Arts; and both Beethoven Orchestra Bonn's inaugural tour to China under Maestro Stefan Blunier and Detroit Symphony Orchestra’s first China tour under Leonard Slatkin.

Lee gave the world premiere in October 2012 of Bright Sheng's latest cello concerto inspired by Dunhuang, one of China's cultural treasures.

In 2014, he was invited for the launch of the IMAGINE Project at the UN General Assembly Hall with Yoko Ono, Hugh Jackman and ABBA’s Bjorn Ulvaeus to commemorate the 25th anniversary of the United Nations Convention on the Rights of the Child.

Lee also performed in a fundraising concert for well-known anti-apartheid and human rights activist Denis Goldberg and his House of Hope Foundation in South Africa.

Since 2020 he has performed with the Canadian piano quartet Ensemble Made in Canada.

Lee plays on the 1703 “Comte de Gabriac” cello by Venetian master maker Matteo Goffriller.

TV 
In 2004, Lee was featured in Radio Television Hong Kong's TV documentary Outstanding Young Chinese Musicians alongside pianists Lang Lang and Yundi Li. Lee also appeared on a Phoenix Television global live broadcast concert with the China Symphony Orchestra at the Beijing National Center for Performing Arts.

Honors and Awards
Lee has won major international competitions, including First Prize at the 2004 International Antonio Janigro Cello Competition.  Prior to winning the Antonio Janigro competition, he won major prizes at New York's Naumburg Competition and Helsinki's International Paulo Competition.

Discography
Collaborating with EMI, Lee has released several albums and was a featured soloist on the original EMI-released sound track recording for the German-Taiwan-Hong Kong co-produced film The Drummer, which was in competition at the Sundance Film Festival in 2008.

Lee's discography includes:

Musicus Society
Lee co-founded Musicus Society in 2010 with his sister Chui-Inn Lee, a charitable organization based in Hong Kong with the mission of promoting cross cultural collaboration through music.

References

External links 
 Lee's Official Website
 Lee performing with Eugene Pao and the Trondheim Sololists (Musicus Fest 2018 Festival Opening)
 Lee performing with the Munich Chamber Orchestra (Haydn Cello Concerto in C Major)

Chinese classical cellists
Living people
Hong Kong classical musicians
Hong Kong expatriates in Canada
Harvard University alumni
EMI Classics and Virgin Classics artists
Year of birth missing (living people)
Canadian classical cellists